

Polish graphic designers
Roman Cieślewicz
Stasys Eidrigevicius
Jan Lenica
Jan Mlodozeniec
Adam Niklewicz
Wiesław Rosocha
Wiktor Sadowski
Jan Sawka
Franciszek Starowieyski
Piotr Szyhalski
Henryk Tomaszewski
Jurek Wajdowicz
Wiesław Wałkuski
Mieczysław Wasilewski

See also
Polish School of Posters
List of graphic designers
List of Polish painters
Graphic design

 
Graphic designers
 
Poland